Rowelle Blenman (born December 31, 1967) is an English former American football cornerback who played nine seasons in NFL Europe for the London Monarchs and Scottish Claymores. He also played in the British American Football League (BAFL) with the London Ravens and London Olympians, helping the Olympians win the Eurobowl Championship in 1993 and 1994.

References

English players of American football
1967 births
Living people
Sportspeople from London
American football cornerbacks
London Monarchs players
Scottish Claymores players
British American Football League players